This article will display the squads for the football tournament at the 2011 Pan American Games in Guadalajara.

All players in this tournament must be born on or after 1 January 1989. Each participating association must name 18 players in the squad.

Group A

Head coach:  Sixto Vizuete

Head coach:  Angus Eve

Head coach:  Luis Fernando Tena

Head coach:  Juan Verzeri

Group B

Head coach:   Walter Perazzo

Head coach:  Ney Franco

Source:

Head coach:  Carlos Watson

Head coach: Chandler González

References

External links
Official website
Squads of each country

Team squads at the 2011 Pan American Games
Football at the 2011 Pan American Games
Pan American Games football squads